Marketside was a chain of grocery stores owned by Walmart in the metro Phoenix area. The stores were opened in October 2008 and closed in October 2011. Only four locations operated, in Chandler; Gilbert; Mesa; and Tempe. Each store was about 16,000 square feet in size. The brand was created in response to Tesco's Fresh & Easy stores, which were in a similar format.

References

External links
 Walmart Corporate Official Homepage
 Marketside Homepage<++(even though it appears to be an "archive" [dot org] URL)

Defunct supermarkets of the United States
Defunct companies based in Arizona
Walmart
Retail companies established in 2008
Retail companies disestablished in 2011
2008 establishments in Arizona
2011 disestablishments in Arizona